Ganjiakou Subdistrict is a subdistrict of Haidian District, Beijing, It borders Zizhuyuan and Beixiaguan Subdistricts in the north, Zhanlan Road and Yuetan Subdistrict in the east, Yangfangdian Subdistrict in the south, and Balizhuang Subdistrict in the west. As of 2020, its population was 117,946.

The name Ganjiakou came from a village that used to exist within the region.

History

Administrative Divisions 
Ganjiakou Subdistrict was divided into 24 communities as of 2021:

See also 
 List of township-level divisions of Beijing

References 

Subdistricts of Beijing
Haidian District